The Tri-nation series in Sri Lanka in 2010 was the One Day International cricket tournament in Sri Lanka that was held between India, Sri Lanka and New Zealand in the month of August 2010. All the matches were held in Rangiri Dambulla International Stadium, Dambulla.

Format
Points were awarded in group stage as follows:

One bonus point was awarded in a match if a team won with a run rate 25% or more higher than the losing team. (i.e. By winning within 40 overs batting second or by restrict the opposition to 80% of their target after batting first.)

Fixtures

Group stage

Points table

Round 1

New Zealand elected to bat and collapsed at 28/3 before Scott Styris and Ross Taylor came into the crease and scored 88 and 95 respectively this helped to push the New Zealand total to 288. India then started to bat and got of to a good start before a flurry of Indian wickets fell starting with opener Virender Sehwag, most of the batters were caught in the slip cordon. India then collapsed at 88.

Round 2

Final

Media coverage

Television
Ten Sports / TEN Cricket : India, Pakistan, Middle East, Indonesia, Hong Kong and Singapore
Doordarshan : India (Only India matches and final)
Zee Café : England and Wales
SuperSport : South Africa, Kenya and Zimbabwe
Setanta Sports : Australia
Sri Lanka Rupavahini Corporation : Sri Lanka
Sky Network Television : New Zealand

References 

2010 in cricket
Cricket in Dambulla